Majid Aflaki (born 26 August 1973) is an Iranian taekwondo practitioner. He competed in the 2000 Summer Olympics.

References

1973 births
Living people
Taekwondo practitioners at the 2000 Summer Olympics
Iranian male taekwondo practitioners
Olympic taekwondo practitioners of Iran
Asian Games silver medalists for Iran
Asian Games bronze medalists for Iran
Asian Games medalists in taekwondo
Taekwondo practitioners at the 1998 Asian Games
Taekwondo practitioners at the 2002 Asian Games
Medalists at the 1998 Asian Games
Medalists at the 2002 Asian Games
20th-century Iranian people